"Across the Bridge" is the 27th television play episode of the first season of the Australian  anthology television series Australian Playhouse. "Across the Bridge" was written by Liane Keen and directed by Pat Alexander and originally aired on ABC on 17 October 1966.

Plot
A man and a divorced woman who lives alone in a house over looking Sydney Harbour meet through the arrangement of mutual friends - and their few hours together open doorways to an understanding both deep and tenuous.

Cast
 Carol Raye as the Woman
 Allan Trevor as the Man
 Tony Ingersent
 Susan Vaughan
 Paula Peters

Reception
The Age said it "had a pretty thin and somewhat hackneyed theme, but two experienced and talented actors to interpret it." Another reviewer from the same paper said the script "had a strong ring of truth."

References

External links
 
 

1966 television plays
1966 Australian television episodes
1960s Australian television plays
Australian Playhouse (season 1) episodes